Marcela Eliana Acuña (born 16 October 1976) is an Argentine professional boxer and part-time politician. She has held multiple super bantamweight world titles, including the IBF title since 2018; the WBA title from 2006 to 2008; the WBC title twice between 2008 and 2010; the WBO title from 2013 to 2014; the IBF title from 2016 to 2018; and the WBA interim featherweight title in 2016. As of September 2020, she is ranked as the world's best active female super bantamweight by The Ring and BoxRec, and the third best active female, pound for pound, by BoxRec and tenth by The Ring. She won the Konex Award Merit Diploma in 2010 as one of the five best Boxers of the last decade in Argentina.

Early life
Acuña enjoyed boxing from a very early age. At the age of seven, she visited a boxing gym for the first time. Her first trainer, Ramon Chaparro, would many years later become her husband.

Marcela Acuña became an accomplished martial arts fighter before she decided to box for money. At the age of twelve, she had earned a black belt and she became South America's champion in her division by the age of fourteen. She made sixteen successful title defenses.

She had to retire from karate due to pregnancy. In 1995, she and Chaparro had their first son. After some time away from combat sports, Acuña decided that she would return, only this time, she would compete in boxing.

Professional boxing career
Acuña made her professional debut on 5 December 1997 against Christy Martin in Pompano Beach, Florida, on an undercard that was headlined by Johnny Tapia's world championship defense against Puerto Rico's Andy Agosto and which was shown nationally across the United States. Acuña was dropped in round ten, but she rose and finished the bout on her feet. Despite losing a unanimous decision by scores of 100-90 and 99-90 (twice), Acuña's performance was hailed by many fans and critics alike, considering that this was her first professional boxing bout.

In just her second professional fight she met Lucia Rijker on 25 September 1998, at Ledyard, Connecticut, for the vacant IBO super lightweight title. Acuña was knocked out in five rounds.

After losing her first two fights, Acuña stepped away from boxing.

Return to boxing

Acuña returned to boxing in 2001, and she and her rival, Jamillia Lawrence of New Jersey, made Argentine boxing history when they participated in the first ever women's boxing fight to be sanctioned by the Argentine boxing commission. Acuña got her first win, with a four-round split decision over the American at Buenos Aires, on 12 February of that year.

On 1 June, she obtained a six-round unanimous decision win over Luz Marina Sanabria Ledesma of Colombia, at Formosa.

Twenty eight days later, she got her first knockout win, when she defeated Uruguay's Andrea Pereyra in only two rounds.

On 11 August, she returned to Buenos Aires, to defeat Yolanda Marrugo, dropping her twice, on her way to a six-round unanimous decision.

On September 21, she fought at Carlos Monzón's birthplace, Santa Fe, when she was rematched with Pereyra. Acuña knocked out Pereyra in five rounds, and Pereyra required hospitalization after this fight. Acuña was awarded the "La Opinion's 80th anniversary" trophy that night.

On 12 October she knocked out Ana Dos Santos in two rounds, for her last appearance of 2001.

Her first fight of 2002 was preceded by much media hype. She was challenged by famous fitness instructor Patricia Quirico, who herself was making her professional debut when she boxed Acuña.

If for nothing else, the fight was widely expected because Quirico was a well known personality with developed body strength, who helped fan interest for the fight develop when she began to threaten Acuña through the media. Although she was 40 years old already, she seemed to feel an authentic dislike towards Acuña, and fans across Argentina spoke about the fight on the weeks prior to the event. The fact Quirico had participated in twenty three exhibition matches, as well as in karate and baseball also helped fan interest grow.

They met on 19 January 2002, at Buenos Aires. Acuña scored one of the quickest knockouts in boxing history, when she landed a right to Quirico's chin right after the first bell rang, and followed it with a left that sent Quirico to the floor. Quirico was counted out and Acuña officially won the fight at fourteen seconds of round one. The win earned her the Argentine Featherweight title.

On 1 March she had to fight one of her closest friends, Carmen Montiel, to defend her Argentina title. Acuña outpointed Montiel over ten rounds.

Next, she would have had her second world title try, on 6 April against Panama's Damaris Pinock Ortega, for the vacant WIBA title. The 2002 Argentine economic crisis, however, forced for the fight to be postponed.

On 29 June she and Montiel had a rematch, and Acuña again prevailed, by an eight-round unanimous decision.

World championships
Acuña then lost weight, going down all the way to the Super Bantamweight division to get her second try at becoming a world champion. In what was the first ever women's boxing world championship fight to be staged in Argentina, Acuña lost a split decision to champion Alicia Ashley.

Acuña then decided to take another two-year lay-off, but she had also decided to stay around the Super Bantamweight division's weight limit, because she wanted to fight in that division from there on. And when she returned for the second time, on 21 February 2003, she knocked out former Regina Halmich challenger Lourdes Gonzalez in two rounds to win the Argentine Super Bantamweight title.

On 10 May she fought in a place where boxing matches are rare: Tierra del Fuego, where she knocked out Ana Davila Ferreira in two rounds.

Then came a rematch with Ashley. On her third world title try, Acuña lost to Ashley for the second time, this time by a ten-round unanimous decision, on 14 June.

On 22 August she and her friend Carmen Montiel met for the third time, and Acuña again beat Montiel on points, this time in six rounds. This victory set up the stage for Acuña's fourth world title try.

On 6 December, she and Panamanian Pinock Ortega finally got to meet, and Acuña became world champion when she knocked out Ortega in the sixth round for the vacant WIBA Super Bantamweight title.

On 26 May 2004, she made her first world championship defense, knocking out Daysi Padilla in the first round. Padilla, who had former world champion Ricardo Cardona at her corner, also required a short stay at a hospital.

On 11 September 2004, Acuña knocked out Ana Camilla Santos in the third round of a non-title bout.

On 22 January 2005, she knocked out Maria Elena Miranda in three rounds to win the WIBA's vacant world Featherweight title, at Formosa.

Politics 
In 2009 she was fourth on the Peronist list running for city council in Tres de Febrero Partido.

Championships and accomplishments
2013-2014 – WBO super bantamweight title (2 defenses)
2012 – WBC Silver super bantamweight title (1 defenses)
2012 – AOCA / Awakening Outstanding Contribution Award 
2008-2010 - WBC super bantamweight title (4 defenses)
2006-2008 - WBA super bantamweight title (5 defenses)
2005 – WIBA featherweight title (1 defense)
2003 – WIBA super bantamweight title (1 defense)
2003 – Argentina (FAB) super bantamweight title
2002 – Argentina (FAB) featherweight title (1 defense)

Professional boxing record

See also
 List of female boxers

References

External links 

official site 
Marcela Eliana Acuña at Awakening Fighters

1976 births
Living people
People from Formosa, Argentina
Argentine women boxers
Argentine female karateka
World featherweight boxing champions
World boxing champions
Bailando por un Sueño (Argentine TV series) participants